The Armenia women's national under-16 basketball team is a national basketball team of Armenia, administered by the Basketball Federation of Armenia. It represents the country in women's international under-16 basketball competitions.

The team won one gold and two silver medals at the FIBA U16 Women's European Championship Division C.

See also
Armenia women's national basketball team
Armenia women's national under-18 basketball team
Armenia men's national under-16 basketball team

References

External links
Archived records of Armenia team participations

Armenia national basketball team
Women's national under-16 basketball teams
Basketball